Kissy Suzuki is a fictional character introduced in Ian Fleming's 1964 James Bond novel, You Only Live Twice. Despite Bond's womanizing, Kissy Suzuki (at least the literary version) remains the only character known to the reader who bears a child by him. The treatment of Kissy varies greatly between the novel and the film, where she is never identified by her name, no family name appears in the closing credits and the film ends in the usual Bond-style happy ending.

Novel version
In the book, Kissy is an Ama diver and former Hollywood actress. She is distantly related to a local police superintendent working with Tiger Tanaka, head of the Japanese Secret Service and is, therefore, asked to assist Bond. Bond stays with Kissy's family on an island near the castle, where Ernst Stavro Blofeld maintains a "suicide garden" where people come to die (and are killed by the "gardeners" if they change their mind), and Bond is seeking revenge for the murder of his wife at the conclusion of the previous novel, On Her Majesty's Secret Service. Bond enters the castle alone and succeeds in killing Blofeld and then destroying the castle.

Bond then sustains amnesia in the aftermath of his attack with Blofeld and is believed dead by his superiors; in reality, he comes to believe he is a fisherman and lives with Kissy for several months. Kissy decides that she will not stop him if he decides to pursue his true identity, but will encourage the cover story that allowed him to stay with her until something else happens. When Bond decides to leave for Russia, believing the answers to his identity are there, Kissy does not follow; unknown to Bond, she is pregnant with his child.

Kissy Suzuki does not appear again in the Bond canon, and Bond's child does not appear until "Blast From the Past", a short story published in 1996 by Raymond Benson as a direct sequel to You Only Live Twice. By the time of this story, Kissy is now dead, having died from ovarian cancer a few years before the story's timeline. Bond learns that she bore him a son, James Suzuki; Bond had little involvement in raising him, but paid for his university education. Bond receives a message, apparently from his son, asking him to come to New York City on an urgent matter. When Bond arrives, he finds his son murdered, having been being force-fed fugu syrup. With the aid of an SIS agent, Bond learns that Irma Bunt, Ernst Stavro Blofeld's henchwoman, killed James Suzuki as revenge for Blofeld's death (again in You Only Live Twice). Bond ultimately kills Bunt, but his victory is hollow; he must live with having lost his son, and with the knowledge that he was never a real father to him.

Film version
In the 1967 film adaptation, Kissy is one of the ninja agents working for Tanaka. She is introduced shortly after Aki is killed and is first seen in a mock wedding ceremony as James goes undercover, posing as a Japanese fisherman. Bond and Kissy eventually find Blofeld's secret base, hidden within a volcano and Kissy is sent to alert Tanaka. While swimming to her destination, she is pursued and fired upon by a SPECTRE helicopter, but her experience as a pearl diver enables her to dive underwater and stay there long enough to convince her pursuers that she drowned. After alerting Tanaka, she joins the raid that manages to foil Blofeld's scheme, thereby averting the outbreak of World War III.

In the movie, Kissy is played by Mie Hama. She was originally cast to be played by Akiko Wakabayashi; however, Hama had trouble learning English for the much bigger role of Aki, so the two decided to swap their roles. When Hama became ill during shooting, Sean Connery's wife Diane Cilento doubled for her in the swimming sequence. Her lines were dubbed by Nikki van der Zyl.

Cultural impact
A limited number of Kissy Suzuki dolls were produced in 1967; today, these dolls are valuable on the collector market. Mie Hama also appeared in Playboy magazine in a 1967 nude pictorial "007's Oriental Eyefuls"  as the first Asian woman to appear in the magazine, a source of controversy in Japan. Pajiba included Hama on the list of the 15 most embarrassing post-Bond roles for Bond Girls at number seven for King Kong Escapes.

UGO.com offered a mixed review of the character: "Although Mie Hama is attractive in her bikini, this also looks extremely out of place. Similarly inconsistent is her acting, which is charming but forgettable." In another article, UGO called her "sexy yet cute-as-a-kimono." A 2006 retrospective CBS featurette called her "stunning", ranking her as the 23rd best Bond girl. She also placed 18th on the list of the Best Bond girls by LIFE, while Fandango ranked her as 23rd. Yahoo! Movies had her name included in the 2012 list of the best Bond girl names.

References

External links
Kissy Suzuki (Character) at the Internet Movie Database
KISSY SUZUKI - Bond Girls: Declassified at Yahoo!
James Bond multimedia | Mie Hama (Kissy Suzuki)
Kissy Suzuki - James Bond Wiki

Bond girls
Characters in British novels of the 20th century
Fictional Japanese people
Fictional female ninja
Fictional female secret agents and spies
Literary characters introduced in 1964
You Only Live Twice (film)